North Beltrami is an unorganized territory in Beltrami County, Minnesota, United States. The population was 43 at the 2000 census.

Geography
According to the United States Census Bureau, the unorganized territory has a total area of 215.8 square miles (558.9 km2), of which 215.6 square miles (558.3 km2) is land and 0.2 square mile (0.6 km2) (0.10%) is water.

Demographics
At the 2000 census there were 43 people, 17 households, and 12 families in the unorganized territory. The population density was 0.2 people per square mile (0.1/km2). There were 52 housing units at an average density of 0.2/sq mi (0.1/km2).  The racial makeup of the unorganized territory was 100.00% White. Hispanic or Latino of any race were 2.33%.

Of the 17 households 23.5% had children under the age of 18 living with them, 64.7% were married couples living together, and 29.4% were non-families. 29.4% of households were one person and none had someone living alone who was 65 or older. The average household size was 2.53 and the average family size was 3.08.

The age distribution was 23.3% under the age of 18, 7.0% from 18 to 24, 25.6% from 25 to 44, 25.6% from 45 to 64, and 18.6% 65 or older. The median age was 42 years. For every 100 females, there were 95.5 males. For every 100 females age 18 and over, there were 120.0 males.

The median household income was $30,625 and the median family income  was $36,250. Males had a median income of $35,000 versus $16,250 for females. The per capita income for the unorganized territory was $16,786. None of the population or the families were below the poverty line.

References

Populated places in Beltrami County, Minnesota
Unorganized territories in Minnesota